Mukund Sasikumar (born 14 January 1997) is an Indian tennis player.

Sasikumar has a career high ATP singles ranking of 229 achieved on 17 October 2019. He also has a career high ATP doubles ranking of 431 achieved on 3 February 2020.

Sasikumar made his ATP main draw debut at the 2020 Maharashtra Open after receiving a wildcard for the singles main draw.

Challenger and Futures/World Tennis Tour Finals

Singles: 12 (6–6)

References

External links
 
 

1997 births
Living people
Indian male tennis players
Sportspeople from Chennai
Sportspeople from Hyderabad, India
21st-century Indian people